Stephen Leather (born 25 October 1956) is a British thriller author whose works are published by Hodder & Stoughton. He has written for television shows such as London's Burning, The Knock, and the BBC's Murder in Mind series. He is one of the top selling Amazon Kindle authors, the second bestselling UK author worldwide on Kindle in 2011.

Biography

Early life
Leather was born in Manchester. He grew up in Sale and Chorlton-cum-Hardy, and attended Manchester Grammar School. He attended Bath University, where he obtained a BSc in Biochemistry in 1978.

Early career
Leather was employed as a biochemist for ICI, shovelled limestone in a quarry, worked as a baker, a petrol pump attendant, a barman, and worked for the Inland Revenue. He began his writing career as a journalist, working for newspapers such the  Glasgow Herald, Daily Mirror, The Times, Daily Mail, and the South China Morning Post in Hong Kong.

Writing career
Leather began writing when he was in college; however, he "never managed to get beyond a few pages," and did not begin writing full-time until he had worked as a journalist for more than ten years.

His first novel, Pay Off, was written while he was still employed at The Daily Mirror. It was published from the "slush pile" at HarperCollins. The novel is a thriller about a merchant banker who takes revenge on two gangsters who killed his father. The book is set in Scotland, where Leather worked for five years on The Glasgow Herald as a business writer.

His second novel, The Fireman, was written while he was working as the business editor of the South China Morning Post. In The Fireman, a British tabloid journalist travels to Hong Kong to discover why his sister committed suicide. Both novels, and his third, Hungry Ghost, were published by HarperCollins.

Leather wrote his fourth novel, The Chinaman, while working as night news editor on the business desk of The Times in London. At the time, the Provisional Irish Republican Army's bombing campaign was at its height, and in The Chinaman, a Sino-Vietnamese man loses his family in an attack loosely based on the bombing of the Harrods department store in London. Having been turned away by the authorities, the man, a highly decorated Special Forces fighter in the Vietnam War, travels to Ireland and hunts down the people responsible. The book was used as the basis for the 2017 thriller The Foreigner.

Published works
Leather's novels frequently include themes of crime, imprisonment, military service, and terrorism. Settings are typically London and the Far East. Leather writes different series in slightly different genres. The main character of one series, Dan 'Spider' Shepherd, is a former Special Air Service soldier who becomes an undercover policeman. Another series, Jack Nightingale, is about a former police negotiator who becomes a private investigator; this supernatural detective series is also published by Hodder & Stoughton and includes the books Nightfall, Midnight, Nightmare, Nightshade and Lastnight.

Leather has written screenplays for London's Burning, The Knock, and the BBC's Murder in Mind series. Two of his novels, The Stretch and The Bombmaker, were screened for made for TV movies and filmed for Sky Television. The Stretch starred Leslie Grantham and Anita Dobson, two popular soap opera stars from the U.K.

Amazon Kindle releases
Leather became successful in the Amazon Kindle market in 2010. Amazon UK opened an eBook store that year. As reported in The Guardian, Leather anticipated that people buying eBooks would be seeking bargains, and he priced his books at the minimum price for independent writers in order to get his books into the top ten. He then marketed the books on various forums online.

Early in 2011, Leather's books The Basement, Hard Landing, and the vampire novella Once Bitten occupied the top three places in the UK Kindle bestseller list, a feat matched only by Stieg Larsson with his The Girl with the Dragon Tattoo trilogy. That same year, Leather was the second bestselling UK author on the Kindle worldwide, beaten only by Lee Child.

Awards and recognition
In 2002, Leather's book Tango One was nominated for the inaugural CWA Ian Fleming Steel Dagger, awarded by the Crime Writers' Association. His book Hard Landing was nominated for the award in 2004.

His book Cold Kill was nominated for Best Novel in 2007 by International Thriller Writers Inc. In 2011, Leather sold over 500,000 eBooks and was voted by The Bookseller magazine as one of the 100 most influential people in the UK publishing world.

2012 Harrogate Crime Writing Festival
On 5 August 2012, journalist Nick Cohen wrote in The Observer that Leather had created phony Twitter accounts in the name of another writer, and used those accounts to praise Leather's own books. Cohen quoted Leather's response to a question, as a panelist, at the Harrogate Crime Writing Festival, which was recorded for BBC Radio 4:

"As soon as my book is out I'm on Facebook and Twitter several times a day talking about it. I'll go on to several forums, the well-known forums, and post there under my name and under various other names and various other characters. You build up this whole network of characters who talk about your books and sometimes have conversations with yourself."

Leather's comment was widely reported, and, on 3 September 2012, forty nine other British authors issued a group statement in which they "unreservedly condemn" the use of sockpuppets, or paid reviews.

Jeremy Duns and Steve Mosby have alleged that Leather has harassed them online.

Bibliography

Novels

Short stories

Screenplays

Adaptations

 The Stretch (2000), mini-series directed by Frank W. Smith, based on novel The Stretch
 The Bombmaker (2001), mini-series directed by Graham Theakston, based on novel The Bombmaker
 The Foreigner (2017), film directed by Martin Campbell, based on novel The Chinaman
 Tango One (2018), film directed by Sacha Bennett and Helena Holmes, based on novel Tango One

References

External links

 
 

English thriller writers
English crime fiction writers
People educated at Manchester Grammar School
Living people
Writers from Manchester
1956 births
Alumni of the University of Bath